Suárez is a common Spanish surname, widely spread throughout Latin America as a consequence of colonization. In origin it is a patronymic meaning "son of Suero" or "son of Soeiro". It is derived from the Latin name Suerius, meaning "swineherd". The surname originates to the province of Asturias in northwest Spain. This surname is most commonly found in Mexico, Spain, Cuba, and Argentina.

People

Arts and sciences
Alex Suarez (musician) (contemporary), American bassist
Almudena Suarez, Spanish engineer
Andrea Suárez (singer) (born 1979), Thai singer
Aurelio Suárez (1910–2003), Spanish surrealist painter
Blanca Suárez (born 1988), Spanish actress
Bobby A. Suarez (1942–2010), Filipino film director
Cecilia Suárez (born 1971), Mexican actress
Claudia Suárez (born 1987), Venezuelan supermodel
Claudio Suárez (born 1968), Mexican soccer player 
Cristóbal Suárez de Figueroa (1571–1644), Spanish writer and jurist
Daniel Suarez (author) (born 1964), American author of Daemon
Diego Suarez (garden designer) (1888–1974), American garden designer, of the gardens at Villa Vizcaya
Eduardo Aldasoro Suarez (1894–1968), Mexican aviation pioneer
Emma Suárez (born 1964), Spanish actress
Francisco Suárez (1548–1617), Spanish philosopher and theologian
Gastón Suárez (1929–1984), Bolivian writer
Gonzalo Suarez (born 1934), Spanish writer and director
Gonzo Suárez (born 1963), Spanish video game director
Héctor Suárez (1938–2020), Mexican actor and comedian
Héctor Suárez Gomís (born 1968), Mexican actor and singer
Inca Garcilaso de la Vega, born Gomez Suarez de Figueroa (1539–1616), Peruvian historian and writer
Javier Suárez (economist) (born 1966), Spanish economist
Jeremy Suarez (born 1990), American actor
José Suárez (actor) (1919–1981), Spanish actor
José Suárez Carreño (1915–2002), Spanish writer
José Ramiro Suárez Soruco (born 1939), Bolivian paleontologist
José de Cañizares y Suárez (1676–1750), Spanish playwright
Karla Suárez (born 1969), Cuban writer
Luis Suárez Fernández (born 1924), Spanish historian
Maiquel Alejo (born Maiquel Suarez), American television game show hostess
María Aurelia Paula Martínez Suárez, aka Silvia Legrand, (1927–2020), Argentine actress 
María Eugenia Suárez (born 1992), Argentine actress and model
Mariano Mociño Suárez de Figueroa (1757–1820), naturalist from New Spain
Mario Suárez (writer) (1925–1998), American writer
Mario Suárez (singer) (1926–2018), Venezuelan singer
Miguel Ángel Suárez (1939–2009), Puerto Rican film actor
Ofelia Suárez Fox (1923–2006), Cuban poet, lecturer, and radio personality
Pedro Suárez-Vértiz (born 1968), Peruvian singer-songwriter
Rafael Vargas-Suarez (born 1972), American artist
Ray Suarez (born 1957), American journalist, senior correspondent of the PBS program The NewsHour with Jim Lehrer
Rosendo Ruiz Suárez (1885–1983), Cuban musician
Santiago Rafael Armada Suárez (1937–1995), Cuban artist
Sergio Lais-Suárez (born 1957), Argentine surgeon and oncologist
Silvana Suárez (1958–2022), Argentine model
Virgil Suárez (born 1962), American poet, novelist, professor

Business
Julio Suárez, Guatemalan banker
María de los Dolores Olmedo y Patiño Suarez (1908–2002), Mexican businesswoman, friend of Frida Kahlo and Diego Rivera
Nicolás Suárez Callaú (1851–1940), Bolivian rubber baron
Roberto Suárez (c. 1928–2010), president of The Miami Herald
Patrick de Suarez d'Aulan (born 1971), French wine producer

Criminals
Georges Suarez (1890–1944), French journalist executed for collaborating with the Nazi occupation
Guillermo Suárez Mason (1924–2005), Argentine military official convicted of crimes in the Dirty war
Juan Fernando Hermosa Suárez (1976–1996), Ecuadorian teenage serial killer
Roberto Suárez Gómez (1932–2000), Bolivian drug trafficker

Politics
Manuel de Jesús Andrade Suárez (1860–1935)  Colombian writer, journalist and politician
Adolfo Suárez (1932–2014), Spain's first democratically elected prime minister after the dictatorship of General Francisco Franco
Adolfo Suárez Illana (born 1964), Spanish politician, son of Adolfo
Alejandro José Suárez Luzardo (born 1965), Venezuelan politician
Juan Manuel Suárez Del Toro Rivero (contemporary), president of the Spanish Red Cross
Facundo Suárez (contemporary), Argentine politician
Fidel Suárez Cruz (contemporary), Cuban political prisoner
Germán Suárez Flamerich (1907–1990), Venezuelan politician, president of Venezuela
Giustina Pecori-Suárez (1811–1903), wife of Jérôme Bonaparte
Gómez Suárez de Figueroa, 3rd Duke of Feria (1587–1634), Spanish nobleman and diplomat
Hugo Banzer Suárez (1926–2002), Bolivian politician, president of Bolivia
Joaquín Suárez (1781–1868), Uruguayan politician, head of state of Uruguay
José Antonio Alonso Suárez (born 1960), Spanish politician
José María Pino Suárez (1869–1913), Mexican politician, governor of Yucatán
José Quiroga Suárez (1920-2006), Spanish politician, president of Galicia
Juan Alonso de Guzmán y Suárez de Figueroa Orozco (c. 1405–1468), Spanish nobleman and military figure during the Reconquista
Lorenzo Suárez de Mendoza, 5th Count of Coruña (c. 1518–1583), Spanish viceroy of New Spain
Manuel de Jesús Andrade Suárez (1860–1935), Colombian politician
Marco Fidel Suárez (1855–1927), Colombian politician, president of Colombia
Mariano Suárez (1897–1980), Ecuadorian politician, Vice President of Ecuador
Ramiro Suárez Corzo (born 1960), Colombian politician
Roberto Guajardo Suárez (1918–2008), president of Copamex
Vicente Suárez (1833–1847), Mexican defender at the Battle of Chapultepec

Religion
Adolfo Suárez Rivera (1927–2008), Mexican cardinal and archbishop
Federico González Suárez (1844–1917), Ecuadorian bishop and politician
Fernando Suarez (1967–2020), Filipino priest and faith healer
Francisco Suárez (1548–1617), Spanish Jesuit philosopher

Sports
Alejandro Suárez (born 1980), Mexican long-distance runner
Andrew Suarez (born 1992), American baseball player
Antonio Suárez (1932–1981), Spanish professional road-racing cyclist
Arico Suárez (1908-1979), Argentine footballer
Berthy Suárez (born 1969), Bolivian footballer
Carla Suárez Navarro (born 1988), Spanish tennis player
Carlos Adrián Valdez Suárez (born 1983), Uruguayan footballer
Carlos Banteux Suárez (born 1986), Cuban boxer
Carlos Heber Bueno Suárez (born 1980), Uruguayan footballer
César Suárez (born 1984), Venezuelan racing cyclist
Christian Suárez (born 1985), Ecuadorian footballer
Claudio Suárez (born 1968), Mexican footballer
Cristián Suárez (born 1987), Chilean footballer
Cundi (footballer), nickname of Secundino Suárez, (born 1955), Spanish footballer
Damián Suárez (born 1988), Uruguayan footballer
Daniel Suárez (born 1992), Mexican racing driver
Daniel Alberto Néculman Suárez (born 1985), Argentine footballer
David Wladimir Serradas Suárez (born 1969), Venezuelan boxer
Deinis Suárez (born 1984), Cuban baseball player
Denis Suárez  (born 1994), Spanish footballer
Diego Suárez (footballer, born 1992), Bolivian footballer
Edmundo Suárez (1916–1978), Spanish footballer and coach
Enrique Figueroa Suárez (born 1964), Puerto Rican Olympic sailor
Erminio Suárez (born 1969), Argentine track cyclist
Esteban Andrés Suárez (born 1975), Spanish footballer
Eugenio Suárez (born 1991), Venezuelan baseball player
Guillermo Suárez (born 1985), Argentine footballer
Guillermo Gonzalo Giacomazzi Suárez (born 1977), Uruguayan footballer
Guillermo Sandro Salas Suárez (born 1974), Peruvian footballer
Hugo Suárez (born 1982), Bolivian footballer
Jairo Suárez (born 1985), Colombian footballer
Javier Suárez (cyclist) (born c. 1939), Colombian road racing cyclist
Jean de Suarez d'Aulan (1900–1944), French aviator, auto racer, and bobsledder
Jeffrén Suárez (born 1988), Spanish footballer
Jesús Manuel Bravo Suárez (born 1979), Spanish footballer
Jorge Suárez (footballer) (1945–1997), Salvadoran footballer
José Suárez (pitcher/outfielder), Cuban Negro league baseball player
José Suárez (baseball, born 1998), Venezuelan baseball player
José Luis Aragonés Suárez (1938–2014), Spanish footballer
José Manuel Suárez (born 1974), Spanish footballer
Julián Omar Ramos Suárez (born 1988), Spanish footballer
Ken Suarez (born 1943), American baseball player
Leonel Suárez (born 1987), Cuban decathlete
Luis Suárez (born 1987), Uruguayan footballer
Luis Suárez (footballer, born 1935), Spanish footballer and coach
Luis Fernando Suárez (born 1959), Colombian football coach, currently coach of the Honduras national football team
Manny Súarez (born 1993), Chilean-Spanish basketball player
María Ángeles Rodríguez Suárez (born 1957), Spanish field hockey player
Maria Garcia Suarez (born 1978), Spanish sprint canoer
Matías Suárez (born 1988), Argentine footballer
Mario Suárez (footballer) (born 1987), Spanish footballer
Milton Fabián Rodríguez Suárez (born 1976), Colombian footballer
Narciso Suárez (born 1960), Spanish flatwater canoer
Nicolás Suárez (disambiguation), footballers
Osvaldo Suárez (1934–2018), Argentine long-distance runner
Pablo Oscar Rotchen Suárez (born 1973), Argentine footballer
Paola Suárez (born 1976), Argentine tennis player
Paolo Suárez (born 1980), Uruguayan footballer
Ramon López Suárez (born 1969), Spanish basketball coach
Ranger Suárez (born 1995), Venezuelan baseball player
Ricardo Pedriel Suárez (born 1987), Bolivian footballer
Robert Suárez (born 1991), Venezuelan baseball player
Roberto Suarez Seabra (born 1976), Brazilian water polo player
Roberto Canella Suarez (born 1988), Spanish footballer
Roger Suárez (born 1977), Bolivian footballer
Rolando Álvarez Suárez (born 1975), Venezuelan footballer
Rubén Suárez (born 1979), Spanish footballer
Ryan Suarez (born 1977), American soccer player
Sergio A. Matto Suárez (1930–1990), Uruguayan basketball player
Silvio Suárez (born 1969), Paraguayan footballer
Temoc Suarez (born 1975), American soccer player
Tony Suarez (1956–2007), American soccer player
Yoan Pablo Hernández Suárez (born 1984), Cuban boxer
Yosvany Suárez (born 1973), Cuban hammerthrower

Other 
 Diego Suarez (navigator) (fl. 16th century), Portuguese navigator
 Gonzalo Suárez Rendón, Spanish conquistador, founder of Tunja
 Inés Suárez (c. 1507–1580), Spanish conquistadora
 Jane Suarez de Figueroa (1538–1612), Lady in Waiting to Queen Mary Tudor of England
 Juan Fernando Hermosa Suárez (1976–1996), Ecuadorian teenage serial killer
 Manuel Isidoro Suárez (1799–1846), Argentine colonel who fought against the Spanish in the wars of independence
 Teresa Meana Suárez (born 1952), Spanish feminist activist, teacher, and philologist

Pseudonyms
Benito Suárez Lynch, pseudonym of Jorge Luis Borges and Bioy Casares
Suarez Miranda, pseudonym of Jorge Luis Borges

Fictional
Betty Suarez, the main character in the TV series Ugly Betty
Hilda Suarez, fictional character in the television show Ugly Betty
Ignacio Suarez, fictional character in the television show Ugly Betty
Justin Suarez, fictional character in the television show Ugly Betty
Omar Suarez (Scarface), fictional character in the 1983 film Scarface
Rosa Mia Suarez, fictional character in the Filipino cineseries Bituing Walang Ningning
Frida Suárez, fictional character in the television show El Tigre: The Adventures of Manny Rivera

See also
Soares

Spanish-language surnames
Patronymic surnames
Surnames from given names